The Vancouver Convention Centre (formerly known as the Vancouver Convention & Exhibition Centre, or VCEC) is a convention centre in Vancouver, British Columbia, Canada; it is one of Canada's largest convention centres. With the opening of the new West Building in 2009, it now has  of meeting space. It is owned by the British Columbia Pavilion Corporation, a Crown corporation owned by the government of British Columbia. The Centre served as the main press centre and International Broadcast Centre for the 2010 Winter Olympics.

East Building 
The East Building is located in Canada Place, which it shares with a cruise ship terminal, and the Pan Pacific hotel.

The East Building served as the venue for a series of religious gatherings which hosted His Highness Prince Karim Aga Khan 49th Imam of Ismaili Muslims, on August 24, 25, 26, 1992 as well as June 10, 2005.

The East Building also served as the main press centre for the 2010 Winter Olympics.

West Building 

The West Building is directly adjacent to Canada Place and consists of  total interior space including  of convention space,  of retail space along a public waterfront promenade, and 450 parking stalls. The project also supplies infrastructure for future water based developments including an expanded marina, a float plane terminal, and water-based retail opportunities. The design architect for the expansion is LMN Architects of Seattle, in association with Vancouver firms MCM Architects and DA Architects + Planners. Morrison Hershfield ensured quality assurance and conducted enhanced field review during construction of all building envelope components including innovative curtain wall glazing and green roof. On February 9, 2010, the building was certified LEED Platinum by the Canada Green Building Council.

The West Building opened to the public on April 4, 2009, and had a final cost of $883,000,000 CAD (exclusive of land). The building hosted the International Broadcast Centre for the 2010 Winter Olympics and 2010 Winter Paralympics. Connecting to the centre is the Fairmont Pacific Rim hotel.

Adjacent to the West building is the "Jack Poole Plaza" (formerly known as Thurlow Plaza), in honour of Jack Poole, who died of pancreatic cancer in 2009. He was responsible for securing the bid of the 2010 Winter Olympics and 2010 Winter Paralympics for Vancouver.

Sustainability  
The new West Building expansion is certified Leadership in Energy and Environmental Design Platinum (LEED) and is designated a PowerSmart Convention Centre by BC Hydro. It was awarded a "Go Green" certificate from the Building Owners and Managers Association (BOMA) for industry-approved, environmental best practices in building management.  The living roof, seawater heating and cooling, on-site water treatment and fish habitat built into the foundation of the West Building make it one of the greenest convention centres in the world. The Centre recycles an average of 180,000 kilograms of materials annually, nearly half of the total volume of waste generated. It avoids canned goods, disposable utensils and dishes, and donates leftover food to local charities.

The  "living roof" is the largest in Canada and the largest non-industrial living roof in North America. The roof landscape is designed as a self-sustaining grassy habitat characteristic of coastal British Columbia, including 400,000 native plants and 4 colonies of 60,000 bees each which provide honey for the public plaza restaurant. No public access is allowed to the roof, which made it possible to create a fully functional ecosystem with natural drainage and seed migration patterns using the roof's architectural topography. The landscape functionally connects to nearby Stanley Park via a corridor of waterfront parks. Irrigation to the roof is provided by the building's wastewater treatment plant. In the event that the roof irrigation demands exceed the capacity of the wastewater treatment plant, make-up water can be provided by a reverse osmosis desalinization plant drawing and treating seawater pumped from the harbour as well as municipal water through an air gap connection to the storage tanks, as needed.

All wastewater from washrooms, retail, and restaurant activities in the building is reclaimed and recycled for use in toilet and urinal flushing, and green roof irrigation. The treatment facility uses a membrane bioreactor process, manufactured and supplied by GE/Zenon, consisting of two 2-zone (anoxic/oxic) bioreactor tanks (with internal recycle) and an ultra-filtration (hollow-fibre) membrane tank, followed by a chlorine contact tank that serves to remove colour and disinfect the reclaimed water. With the City of Vancouver 2012 commercial metered water and sewer rates at $2.803 and $1.754, respectively, the convention centre can save over $21,000 per month in utility fees through water reuse. One of the biggest operating challenges when the facility first started up was the ability to maintain the treatment plant bacteria in a healthy condition during lengthy periods (e.g. late December through mid-January) with limited wastewater to feed the treatment plant due to limited convention activity and concurrent wastewater generation within the building; however, once the restaurants in the building were established this challenge was resolved.

The building's heating and cooling system feeds through the deep water of the harbor, using it as a constant temperature base to reduce the amount of energy used for heating and cooling.

Along the waterfront, the shoreline ecology is fully restored from its previous brownfield state and supports a historic salmon migration path. An artificial reef structure rings the building perimeter, consisting of a series of concrete steps. Each step is planted with marine species adapted to a specific depth below the water, resulting in a kelp forest characteristic of the natural shoreline and supporting a diversity of harbor fauna. Underneath the building, which is set on pier foundations, runnels are set into the tide flats creating a tidal ecosystem zone that flushes daily and feeds the reef.

The site of the expansion is a former marine and rail industrial area, most of which was covered in impervious surfaces and contaminated. The expansion led to a decrease in the site's impervious surfaces by almost 30 percent, mitigating total suspended solids and phosphorus content from stormwater and reducing the site's heat-island contribution.

Awards 
In 2002, and again in 2008, the VCEC was awarded the International Association of Congress Centres (AIPC) "Apex Award" for the "World's Best Congress Centre". In April 2010, the West Building expansion received an Award of Excellence from the Urban Land Institute. It has also received multiple awards from the AIA Seattle chapter.

References

External links 
 
Vancouver2010.com profile

Convention centres in Canada
Buildings and structures in Vancouver
Tourism in Vancouver
Olympic International Broadcast Centres
Tourist attractions in Vancouver